The C.A.S. School (initials for Center of Advanced Studies) is a private school located in Karachi, Pakistan. It is located in DHA/Clifton, Phase 8 and has two campuses, the Main Campus (3rd grade- 11th grade) and The Kindergarten Section (Playgroup- 2nd grade).

The C.A.S. school offers a 14-year programme from Playgroup to O-Level, with a total of 1,250 students, 205 teaching members and 80 support staff in the two campuses. The school's curriculums include common subjects such as English (also the main language of instruction), Urdu, math, science, history, geography.

History
The C.A.S. School was founded by Sami Mustafa. The school originally existed in P.E.C.H.S as a single branch on a neighbourhood street a few kilometres parallel to Tariq Road. Over time the branch was divided into the Kindergarten section (KG 1 and 2 + Grade 1 and 2), the Junior section (Grade 3-6) and Senior section (Grade 7-11). All branches were located in the same general area in P.E.C.H.S. By January 2005, the Kindergarten section was moved to the previous Senior section, while the Junior and Senior sections were moved to DHA/Clifton. The late renowned architect Habib Fida Ali designed the newer school building.

Issues
Like school's all over the world, the CAS school deals with the issue of bullying, and since the late 2000s, cyberbullying as well. The school also recently had issues over exam schedules, which became a cause of inconvenience to students and their families.

Receptions
A student review of the CAS school published in the Express Tribune wrote in favor of the school with the reasons being the various opportunities it offers alongside the diversity of students. Another writer for the Tribune, a banker, argued that CAS happens to be better than other prestigious schools in Karachi such as Karachi Grammar School because it incorporates handicapped students as well as students with other physical disabilities. The C.A.S. School also offers unique learning opportunities through its modules program, via which students can learn and take part in a different extra curricular every year such as rowing, horse riding, culinary arts, taekwondo, rollerblading, and so on.

Major incidents
In the month of September in 2011, a bomb blast carried out by the Pakistani Taliban targeted a senior police officer residing in the area. The impact of the blast severely damaged Washington International School, killing one teacher while also causing damage to parts of the CAS school, also located in the same area.

References

External links 
 The CAS School - official website

Schools in Karachi
Educational institutions established in 1981
1981 establishments in Pakistan